The following is the Bulgarian order of battle at the beginning of the First Balkan War as of October 8, 1912.  After its mobilization the field army counted for 366,209 men and represented half the field forces of the Balkan League. Its greater part was deployed in the main theater of the war in Thrace  but the army also contributed to the allied war effort in Macedonia. This order of battle includes all combat units, including engineer and artillery units, but not medical, supply, signal and border guard units.

GHQ
The nominal commander in chief of the Bulgarian Army was Tsar Ferdinand I but de facto its control and leadership were in the hands of his deputy Lieutenant-General Mihail Savov. The Chief of the General Staff was Major-General Ivan Fichev with Colonel Stefan Nerezov as his Deputy Chief.

Thracian Theater

First Army

First Army was commanded by lieutenant-general Vasil Kutinchev.

 1st Sofia Infantry Division ( Major-General Toshev)
 1st Brigade (Colonel Zheliavski)
 1st "Sofia" Infantry Regiment
 6th "Turnovo" Infantry Regiment
 2nd Brigade (Major-General Popov)
 37th Infantry Regiment
 38th Infantry Regiment
4th QF FAR
4th FAR
1st Pioneer Battalion
 3rd Balkan Infantry Division ( Major-General Sarafov)
 1st Brigade (Colonel Paskalev)
 11th "Sliven" Infantry Regiment
 24th "Black Sea" Infantry Regiment
 2nd Brigade (Colonel Ribarov)
 29th "Yambol" Infantry Regiment
 32nd "Zagora" Infantry Regiment
 3rd Brigade (Major-General Tepavicharov)
 41st Infantry Regiment
 42nd Infantry Regiment
6th QF FAR
6th FAR
3rd Pioneer Battalion
 10th Infantry Division ( Major-General Bradistilov)
 1st Brigade (Colonel Petev)
 16th "Lovech" Infantry Regiment
 25th "Dragoman" Infantry Regiment
 2nd Brigade (Colonel Atanas Petrov)
 47th Infantry Regiment
 48th Infantry Regiment
10th FAR
10th Pioneer Battalion

Second Army
Second Army was commanded by lieutenant-general Nikola Ivanov.

 8th Tundzha Infantry Division ( Major-General Kirkov)
 1st Brigade (Colonel Marchin)
 10th "Rhodope" Infantry Regiment
 30th "Sheinovo" Infantry Regiment
 2nd Brigade (Colonel Kardzhiev)
 12th "Balkan" Infantry Regiment
 23rd "Shipka" Infantry Regiment
 3rd Brigade (Colonel Pachev)
 51st Infantry Regiment
 52nd Infantry Regiment
8th QF FAR
8th FAR
8th Pioneer Battalion
 9th Pleven Infantry Division ( Major-General Sirakov)
 1st Brigade (Colonel Evrov)
 4th "Pleven" Infantry Regiment
 17th "Dorostol" Infantry Regiment
 2nd Brigade (Colonel Popov)
 33rd "Svishtov" Infantry Regiment
 34th "Troyan" Infantry Regiment
 3rd Brigade (Colonel Grancharov)
 53rd Infantry Regiment
 54th Infantry Regiment
9th QF FAR
9th FAR
9th Pioneer Battalion
 Haskovo Detachment ( Colonel Delov)
 2/2nd Brigade
 28th "Stremski" Infantry Regiment
 40th Infantry Regiment
3rd FAR
 Mixed Cavalry Brigade (Colonel Tanev)
 3rd Cavalry Regiment
 6th Cavalry Regiment

Third Army

Third Army was commanded by lieutenant-general Radko Dimitriev.

 4th Preslav Infantry Division ( Major-General Boyadzhiev)
 1st Brigade (Colonel Todorov)
 7th "Preslav" Infantry Regiment
 19th "Shumen" Infantry Regiment
 2nd Brigade (Colonel Enchev)
 8th "Primorski" Infantry Regiment
 31st "Varna" Infantry Regiment
 3rd Brigade (Major-General Tserkovkski)
 43rd Infantry Regiment
 44th Infantry Regiment
5th QF FAR
5th FAR
4th Pioneer Battalion
 5th Danube Infantry Division ( Major-General Hristov)
 1st Brigade (Colonel Abadzhiev)
 2nd "Iskar" Infantry Regiment
 5th "Danube" Infantry Regiment
 2nd Brigade (Colonel Sofroniev)
 18th "Etarski" Infantry Regiment
 20th "Dobruja" Infantry Regiment
 3rd Brigade (Colonel Ivanov)
 45th Infantry Regiment
 46th Infantry Regiment
1st QF FAR
1st FAR
5th Pioneers Battalion
 6th Bdin Infantry Division ( Major-General Tenev)
 1st Brigade (Colonel Kantardzhiev)
 3rd "Bdin" Infantry Regiment
 15th "Lom" Infantry Regiment
 2nd Brigade (Colonel Pakov)
 35th "Vratsa" Infantry Regiment
 36th "Kozloduy" Infantry Regiment
2nd FAR
6th Pioneer Battalion

Cavalry
The single Bulgarian cavalry division served independently on the Thracian Theater:
Cavalry Division ( Major-General Nazlamov)
 1st Brigade (Colonel Salabashev)
 1st Cavalry Regiment
 2nd Cavalry Regiment
 2nd Brigade (Colonel Danailov)
 4th Cavalry Regiment
 7th Cavalry Regiment
 10th Cavalry Regiment

Western  Theater

Second Allied Army
Second Allied Army was commanded by General Stepa Stepanović.

 7th Rila Infantry Division (Major-General Todorov)
 1st Brigade (Colonel Mitov)
 13th "Rila" Infantry Regiment
 28th "Pernik" Infantry Regiment
 2nd Brigade (Colonel Chilingirov)
 14th "Macedonian" Infantry Regiment
 22nd "Thracian" Infantry Regiment
 3rd Brigade (Colonel Georgiev)
 49th Infantry Regiment
 50th Infantry Regiment
7th QF FAR
7th FAR
2nd MAR**
5th Cavalry Regiment
7th Pioneer Battalion

Rhodope Detachment
The detachment was commanded by  Major-General Stiliyan Kovachev.

 2nd Thracian Infantry Division (Major-General Kovachev)
 1st Brigade (Colonel Geshov)
 9th "Plovdiv" Infantry Regiment
 21st "Srednogorian" Infantry Regiment
 3rd Brigade (Colonel Mitov)
 27th "Chepinski" Infantry Regiment
 39th  Infantry Regiment
3rd QF FAR
3rd MAR
1st MAR

Unit strengths
The basic Bulgarian infantry division consisted of three infantry brigades, each of two infantry regiments, with each regiment containing four infantry battalions. Additionally these divisions contained two artillery regiments, a cavalry regiment and an engineer battalion.  Their full battle strength consisted of 24 infantry battalions while their total strength made them the equivalent of an army corps. Due to tactical necessities the 1st and 6th divisions each gave one brigade for the formation of a new 10th division and fought during the war with a battle strength of 16 battalions.

Notes
Footnotes

Citations

References

External links
Orders of Battle

First Balkan War
Military history of Bulgaria
Balkan Wars orders of battle